Elia Visconti (born 30 June 2000) is an Italian professional footballer who plays as a defender for  club Lucchese.

Club career
On 13 August 2021, he signed a two-year contract with Lucchese.

International career
He represented Italy at the 2017 UEFA European Under-17 Championship, where they did not advance from the group stage.

References

External links

2000 births
Living people
Sportspeople from the Province of Piacenza
Footballers from Emilia-Romagna
Italian footballers
Association football defenders
Serie C players
Inter Milan players
Bologna F.C. 1909 players
Piacenza Calcio 1919 players
S.S.D. Lucchese 1905 players
Italy youth international footballers